Manoa Vosawai (born 12 August 1983 in Suva, Fiji) is an Italian rugby union player. He currently plays for the Cardiff Blues in Wales. He made his debut with the Italian national side on August 18, 2007 in a match against . Vosawai plays as a number eight.
Vosawai was included in the Italian squad for the 2007 World Cup, and made a substitute appearance in the Azzurri's opening match against the All Blacks, replacing Alessandro Zanni.

He joined Benetton Treviso in June 2010.

In March 2014 it was announced that Vosawai would join Cardiff Blues for the upcoming 2014/2015 season.

References

External links
 Stats at scrum.com
 Stats at erc.com
 Info at rugbyworldcup.com

1983 births
Italian rugby union players
Living people
Rugby union number eights
Benetton Rugby players
Cardiff Rugby players
Fijian expatriate sportspeople in Italy
Italy international rugby union players
Fijian expatriate rugby union players
Expatriate rugby union players in Italy
I-Taukei Fijian people
Rugby Club Vannes players
People educated at Suva Grammar School